Eternia may refer to:
Eternia (rapper), a Canadian female rapper
Tales of Eternia, a role-playing video game, renamed to Tales of Destiny II in North America
 The fantasy planet that serves as main setting to the Masters of the Universe
 The fantasy continent in Bravely Default and its sequels